This is a list of elected officials serving the city of Los Angeles, California.  It includes member of the Los Angeles City Council, Los Angeles County Board of Supervisors, California State Assembly, California State Senate, United States House of Representatives, and Los Angeles citywide officials.

City officers

City Council members

U.S. House of Representatives

California State Senate

California Assembly

County Officers

Los Angeles County Board of Supervisors

References

 
Los Angeles elected officials
Elected officials
Los Angeles